Gabriela Flores  is an Argentine film actress.

She has made some 20 film appearances since her debut in 1984 in the film Pasajeros de una pesadilla alongside Federico Luppi.

References

Year of birth missing (living people)
Argentine film actresses
Living people
Place of birth missing (living people)
20th-century Argentine actresses